The International Political Science Review/Revue Internationale de Science Politique is a peer-reviewed academic journal covering the field of political science. The editors-in-chief are Marian Sawer (Australian National University) and Theresa Reidy (University College Cork). It was established in 1980 and is published by SAGE Publications on behalf of the International Political Science Association.

Editors' choice and thematic special issues 
Editors' choice collections of articles on a particular theme, selected from past issues, were initiated in 2011. So far there have been collections on ideology, regimes and regime change, political parties and party systems, gender and political behaviour, gender and political institutions, religion and politics, the politics of inequality and borders and margins. Access to the articles in these collections is free. 
The journal also regularly publishes thematic special issues. Recent examples include special issues on electoral quotas, Euroscepticism, Populism in World Politics and Diasporas and Sending States in World Politics.

Meisel-Laponce Award 
The journal has a cash prize of $1000 for the best article published in the previous four years. The prize was first awarded in 2012 and went to Jorgen Moller and Svend-Erik Skaaning, for Beyond the radial delusion: Conceptualising and measuring democracy and non-democracy. There is free access to the winning and short-listed articles. In 2016 the prize was awarded to Lingling Qi and Doh Chull Shin for 'How mass political attitudes affect democratization: Exploring the facilitating role critical democrats play in the process'.

The next award will be made at the International Political Science Association's World Congress in Lisbon in 2020.

Most cited article
The most cited paper published in the journal since the beginning of 2002, cited over 900 times according to Google Scholar, is:

Abstracting and indexing 
The journal is abstracted and indexed in Scopus and the Social Sciences Citation Index. According to the Journal Citation Reports, the journal has a 2017 impact factor of 1.321, ranking it 75th out of 169 journals in the category "Political Science".

See also 
 List of political science journals

References

External links 
 

SAGE Publishing academic journals
English-language journals
Publications established in 1980
Political science journals
5 times per year journals